γ-Muurolene synthase (EC 4.2.3.126, Cop3) is an enzyme with systematic name (2E,6E)-farnesyl-diphosphate diphosphate-lase (cyclizing, γ-muurolene-forming). This enzyme catalyses the following chemical reaction

 (2E,6E)-farnesyl diphosphate  γ-muurolene + diphosphate

The enzyme has been characterized from the fungus Coprinus cinereus.

References

External links 
 

EC 4.2.3